Thomas Andrew Clayton (born 16 September 2000) is an English professional footballer who plays as a defender for  club Swindon Town.

Career
Prior to his move to Swindon Town, Clayton played within the Liverpool youth system having joined at under-9 level. He joined Swindon Town in July 2022 and made his professional debut the following month in the 0-0 draw against Salford City.

Career statistics

References

External links

2000 births
Living people
Scottish footballers
Association football defenders
Swindon Town F.C. players
English Football League players